TJ Norris (born October 10, 1965) is an American interdisciplinary artist known for his urban, conceptual photography and installation projects. Hailing from New England, Norris is also a celebrated curator and freelance writer based in Texas.

Early life and education
Norris was born at the Boston Lying-In Hospital in Boston, Massachusetts to longshoreman Kenneth C. Whiting and chef Phyllis M. Whiting (née Norris). The paternal side of Norris' family are Irish and his maternal side is Canadian, more specifically Newfoundland, also originating from Ireland. Making visual art from found objects was evident as early as age six, and developed into elementary school where he would win his first student awards. At an early age Norris worked various odd jobs from an insurance claims clerk, security services and purchasing agent. Norris was educated in Catholic schools from pre-school through high school. In recent years he has referred to himself as a polytheist and a feminist. He studied at Massachusetts College of Art with influential American photographers Abelardo Morell and Laura McPhee and at Nova Scotia College of Art & Design. Between the late 1990s and 2000s he put his thoughts into writing as a journalist for such publications as ARTnews, Signal to Noise, Resident Advisor, OregonLive.com, Paris Transatlantic, Art Ltd. and Willamette Week among others.

Work
Since 1990 Norris' studio practice is multidisciplinary, a hybrid of photography, video and installation. His first one-man show was held at the Boston Center for the Arts at age 25 in 1990. His work has been primarily based on the urban environment. His work has been referred to as dystopian, lo-tech and sterile, engaging postmodern issues of loss, surveillance culture, parallel universe, racism, ego, phobia, and death. Some of Norris' influences have been rumored to be disparate figures in the world of the arts and sciences including J. G. Ballard, Roald Dahl, Emmanuel Levinas and Marcel Duchamp.

Norris has shown in the Americas as well as internationally in Italy, the UK, China, Belgium, and is held in the collections of the Fuller Museum of Art, Museo de la Ciudad, Vanhaerents Art Collection, Amon Carter Museum of American Art and the Kimmel Harding Nelson Center for the Arts as well as numerous private collections. His work has been featured in Photographer's Forum, Art Ltd, Leonardo (journal) (MIT Press), Shades of Grey Magazine (France), The Oregonian, The Boston Globe and Silvershotz (Australia), among others. In the past decade his work has been featured at the Tacoma Art Museum, South Bend Art Museum, and at the Center on Contemporary Art (Seattle). He has developed several collaborations with sound artists and composers such as Scanner (Robin Rimbaud), Asmus Tietchens, Leif Elggren and Christian Renou (Brume) among others. These collaborations led to critical observations about the intersection between sound and visual art. His work has been cited to be influenced by Experimental music and Post-punk.

Publishing
In 2010 Norris developed the now defunct Toneshift.net as an online archive of his critical writing on experimental/electronic music. The original site included critical reviews and interviews of genre-defying sound-based work, for which Norris was Publisher. The online magazine was resurrected in 2018 with a growing team of contributors which eventually evolved into a weekly podcast otherwise known as Toneshift Radio on Mixcloud. Completing its decade of programming in December 2020 this overlapped with Norris' new venture, Notetaking.blog, a podcast dedicated to the art of the olfactory sense.

In 2014 Norris founded and published GoFigureNews.com as a resource for adult collectors of art toys produced by indie toymakers. The popular online magazine boasted a sizable international social media following in its third year of publication. Now defunct, the site presented interviews, reviews and features on artists including Luke Chueh, Jason Freeny, Frank Kozik, and Sket One. Brands such as Kidrobot, Medicom and several others were regularly featured in a daily format. The primary focus of the magazine was to illustrate the scope of the independent designer toy scene and those creating limited edition 3D works in vinyl, resin and other materials. The site was nominated for three Designer Toy Awards in 2017 and 2018 in two categories completing its three year run in May 2017.

Soundvision
In 2001 Norris founded his signature gallery, Soundvision, a project space which focused on sound-related work, installation and performance. Soundvision was recognized as one of the "10 Best New Places in Portland" by The Oregonian. The gallery featured audio/visual and multimedia work with a focus on installation, 2/3D by artists including Terre Thaemlitz, Robin Rimbaud, Cary Leibowitz, and Janek Schaefer. The space also played host to a series of performances including Belgian composer Vidna Obmana, Illusion of Safety, and Ethan Rose. The gallery closed in November 2003.

Published works
Shooting Blanks (Monograph), 2018 (No Periods Publications, Fort Worth, Texas)
Fur: The Love of Hair (Bruno Gmünder Verlag GmbH), 2012 (Berlin, Germany)
Of Other Spaces (Bureau for Open Culture), 2009 (Columbus, Ohio)
Beyond Trend (F+W Publications), 2008 (Cincinnati, Ohio)
One Shot/Visual Codec, 2007 (Seattle, Washington)
Portland Modern/Radius Studio, 2006 (Portland, Oregon) Issue #3
Bear Book II, 2001 (Hawthorne Press, Editor - Les Wright)
Sgraffito Press, 1997 (Marina Del Rey, California)
Through the Cracks, 1994 (Ragged Edge Press, New York, New York)
New American Paintings, 1993 (Open Studios Press, Boston, Massachusetts)

Shooting Blanks
Norris released his first monograph of photographic imagery from the series, "Shooting Blanks" on May 1, 2018. This collection of constructed photographic images was shot on location in sixteen of the United States and presented at the Tacoma Art Museum, Blue Sky Gallery in Portland, OR and other locations. The first pressing was released in an edition of one hundred copies. The series depicts the detritus of industrial signage in the urban landscape and was developed after the artist traveled to over a dozen U.S. states to capture images for an earlier photographic series, "No Sign" (2008-2013).

Discography 
 2020 - deStill (Flag Day Recordings), Nathan Moody, composer (based on the work of Norris)
 2006 - triMIX (Innova Recordings)
 2003 - The Tribryd Installation Soundtracks (Beta-lactam Ring Records)

In 2003 Beta-lactam Ring Records released Norris' compilation The Tribryd Installation Soundtracks. This collection of soundtracks, were based on his photographic works of the urban and industrial Pacific Northwest and the trio of resulting installations.  In 2006, Innova Recordings/American Composers Forum released mixed, reconstructed versions of compositions by eleven sound artists including Nobukazu Takemura, Andrew Lagowski, (Lustmord) and Troum. Norris' photographic work has been depicted as cover art on several recordings across many genres and international labels since 1999.

Awards
Regional Arts & Culture Council, 2013 / Artistic Focus Grant
Robert Rauschenberg Foundation, 2012 / Change Grant
Oregon Arts Commission, 2012 / Career Opportunity Grant
Regional Arts & Culture Council, 2010 / Professional Development Grant
New American Art Union, 2008 / Couture Stipend
New England Open Studio: The Arts Online, 1999 / NEA (through the Benton Foundation)
Massachusetts Arts Lottery Grant, 1991 / Somerville Arts Council

External links
 Official Site

1965 births
Living people
Artists from Boston
Interdisciplinary artists
Massachusetts College of Art and Design alumni
NSCAD University alumni